The Lippitt Mill is an historic mill at 825 Main Street in West Warwick, Rhode Island.

History

The cotton textile mill was built in 1809, making it the third oldest in Rhode Island after John Slater's Mills in Slatersville, RI and Samuel Slater Slater Mill. The Lippitt Manufacturing Company was founded by Revolutionary War officer, Col. Christopher Lippitt, his brother Charles Lippitt, and Benjamin Aborn, George Jackson, Amasa Mason, and William Mason. During the Depression following of War of 1812 the Lippitt Manufacturing Company survived by supplying yarn to convict weavers in the Vermont prison. The company grew throughout the 19th century becoming a large profitable enterprise in which several generations of the Lippitt family were involved. In 1889 all of the Lippitt Company assets were sold to the firm of B.B. Knight & Robert Knight, founders of Fruit of the Loom. In 1925, B.B. Knight sold the Lippitt Mill property to Joseph Hayes, owner of the Riverpoint Lace Works. The building was added to the National Register of Historic Places in 1973. The Hayes family stopped manufacturing lace here in the early 1970s, but they retained ownership of the property until it went into receivership in 2008. The mill continued operation until 2010, when spring flooding on the Pawtuxet River and a bad economy forced the mill to close.

A plan was announced in 2014 to convert the property to residences for people over 55.

The mill is on the National Register of Historic Places, and is one of the earliest textile mills in Rhode Island.

See also
National Register of Historic Places listings in Kent County, Rhode Island

References

External links
 
Brief History

 NATIONAL REGISTER OF HISTORIC PLACES INVENTORY - NOMINATION FORM

	

Industrial buildings completed in 1809
Industrial buildings and structures on the National Register of Historic Places in Rhode Island
Buildings and structures in West Warwick, Rhode Island
Historic American Buildings Survey in Rhode Island
Lippitt family
Lace
Cotton mills in the United States
National Register of Historic Places in Kent County, Rhode Island